Vasek Pospisil and Bobby Reynolds won the first edition of this tournament, beating Pierre-Ludovic Duclos and Ivo Klec 6–4, 6–7(6), [10–6] in the final.

Seeds

Draw

Draw

References
 Main Draw

Jalisco Open - Doubles
2011 Doubles